Boris Rapaić (born 24 October 1997) is a Croatian footballer who plays as a forward for Dugopolje.

Club career
Born in Split, Rapaić joined HNK Hajduk Split in 2007, from NK Dugopolje. In January 2015, he moved abroad after agreeing to an initial six-month loan deal with Inter Milan. He returned to Hajduk in July 2016, and started to appear with the reserve team.

In February 2018, Rapaić joined Fenerbahçe SK and was assigned to their under-21 (A2) squad.  In July he was released, and subsequently had trials at Royal Antwerp FC.

On 24 July 2019, Rapaić switched teams and countries again after signing for UD Las Palmas; he was initially assigned to the B-team in Segunda División B. He made his professional debut on 18 August, coming on as a second-half substitute for Rubén Castro in a 0–1 home loss against SD Huesca in the Segunda División championship.

On 31 January 2020, after one appearance for the main squad and one for the B-side, Rapaić terminated his contract with the Canarians.

Personal life
Rapaić's father Milan was also a footballer. An attacking midfielder, he also started his career at Hajduk.

References

External links

1997 births
Living people
Footballers from Split, Croatia
Croatian footballers
Association football forwards
HNK Hajduk Split players
Fenerbahçe S.K. footballers
UD Las Palmas Atlético players
UD Las Palmas players
NK Dugopolje players
Segunda División players
Segunda División B players
First Football League (Croatia) players
Croatian expatriate footballers
Croatian expatriate sportspeople in Italy
Croatian expatriate sportspeople in Turkey
Croatian expatriate sportspeople in Spain
Expatriate footballers in Italy
Expatriate footballers in Turkey
Expatriate footballers in Spain